Esther Imbert (1570-1593), was a French noblewoman. She was the mistress of Henry IV of France in 1586–1588. She had a child with the king, Gideon (1588-1589). She was accepted by Diane d'Andoins as a mistress of secondary rank.

References 
 Andrew C. P. Haggard: The Amours of Henri de Navarre and of Marguerite de Valois. New York: Brentano's, 1910, pp. 32–40

1570 births
1593 deaths
16th-century French people
Mistresses of Henry IV of France